Battersea Power Station is a London Underground station in Battersea, London, which forms the terminus of the Northern line extension to Battersea.

Partially funded by the redevelopment of Battersea Power Station, the station serves the redevelopment site, as well as Battersea itself. The station is located on Battersea Park Road, close to Battersea Park railway station and a short walking distance from Queenstown Road railway station, forming an out-of-station interchange with both of them. The line and station opened on 20 September 2021. It is the only station on the London Underground network to include the word 'station' in its name.

Services 
The station is located in Zone 1, and is served by the Northern line as part of the extension from Kennington to serve the redevelopment of Battersea Power Station. Trains from Battersea Power Station only run via Charing Cross as the branch is an extension off the Kennington loop. 

The station serves as the terminus for the new branch, with a crossover junction prior to the station allowing trains to terminate in either platform. Overrun tunnels underneath Battersea Dogs & Cats Home were proposed, however these were omitted to save money. Provision has been made for a possible future extension to Clapham Junction railway station. The station also serves as an out-of-station interchange with Battersea Park railway station.

Service pattern 

8tph to High Barnet via Charing Cross (increases to 10tph in the peak)
2tph to Mill Hill East via Charing Cross

Connections
London Buses routes 156, 344 and 436 serve the station.

Design 

The station was designed and built by a joint venture between Laing O’Rourke and Ferrovial Agroman, with station entrance architecture by Grimshaw. The station design allows for future installation of platform screen doors. 

Art on the Underground commissioned the artist Alexandre da Cunha to install a permanent piece of artwork in the ticket hall of the station: a  kinetic sculpture, using a rotating billboard entitled Sunset, Sunrise, Sunset.

History

Construction 

The station was given final approval by the Secretary of State for Transport in November 2014, and construction began in 2015, with completion originally scheduled for 2020. Tunnelling of the Northern line extension began at Battersea, with the two tunnel boring machines, Helen and Amy, departing the site in March 2017 to dig the running tunnels of the extended line.

In the draft edition of the Transport for London (TfL) "Business Plan 2014", issued as part of the TfL Board papers for their meeting on 10 December 2014, the map TfL's Rail Transport Network at 2021 labelled the terminus as "Battersea Power Station", instead of just "Battersea" as had appeared on previous publications. In December 2015, TfL confirmed that the name of the station will be "Battersea Power Station". This means that it is the only station on the Underground to have the word "station" in its official name. There has been some confusion as to whether to construct the name as "Battersea Power (S/s)tation" or "Battersea Power Station station".

In December 2018, the Mayor of London, Sadiq Khan, announced that the project would be delayed until September 2021 at the earliest, "to increase the station's capacity to cope with a higher number of passengers than originally forecast".

By June 2019, major tunnelling and track works had been completed, with an engineering train running on the extension for the first time. By February 2020, construction of the station was nearly complete, with platforms, escalators and the London Underground roundel installed on the station. The first London Underground train ran onto the extension over the 2020 Christmas period, marking the start of the signal testing period.

Opening 
The station opened on 20 September 2021.

In September 2022, TfL announced that over 5 million trips had been made on the extension since opening, with an average of 80,000 trips a week at Battersea Power Station. Battersea Power Station noted that demand will increase further, as the site reopened as an office and retail complex in October 2022. TfL estimate that demand could increase to 10 million a year by 2024/25.

References

External links

 
 Northern Line Extension from TfL

Battersea
Buildings and structures in the London Borough of Wandsworth
Northern line stations
Railway stations in Great Britain opened in 2021
Tube stations in the London Borough of Wandsworth